Andrew Maurice Bray (August 27, 1909 – December 8, 1966) was an American football tackle who played two seasons with the Pittsburgh Pirates of the National Football League. He played college football at Southern Methodist University and attended Abilene High School in Abilene, Texas.

References

External links
Just Sports Stats

1909 births
1966 deaths
Players of American football from Texas
American football tackles
SMU Mustangs football players
Pittsburgh Steelers players
People from Paducah, Texas